LAC may refer to:

Places
 La Crescenta, California, unincorporated area in Los Angeles County
 Latin America and the Caribbean
 Latin American and Caribbean Group, United Nations geoscheme region
 Line of Actual Control, a demarcation line between Indian-controlled and Chinese-controlled territories (1959–present)
 Los Angeles County in California
 Los Angeles, California

Education
 Liberal arts college, undergraduate educational institution
 Longburn Adventist College, a Seventh-day Adventist school near Palmerston North, in Longburn, New Zealand

Government and military
 California State Prison, Los Angeles County
 Leading Aircraftman, a rank in some air forces

Organizations
 LAC Group, library services vendor in America
 LAC Minerals, a Canadian mining company
 Ladies' Alpine Club (1907–1975), a club for women climbers, based in London, merged in 1975 with the Alpine Club
 Lake Avenue Church, Pasadena Ca.
 Lancashire Aero Club, flying club in the United Kingdom
 Legal Aid Commission, organisation providing legal aid related to Community legal centres, Australia
 Library and Archives Canada,  national memory institution preserving documentary heritage about Canadian life
 Liga Antituberculosa Colombiana, an organization focused on curing and preventing tuberculosis

Science and technology
 L2TP Access Concentrator, endpoint of a Layer 2 Tunneling Protocol tunnel
 Linear acetylenic carbon, a polymeric carbon chain
 Location Area Code, a unique 16-digit fixed length location area identity code broadcast by a "base transceiver station" in GSM public land mobile network, that identifies a phone number's location area
 Lorenz asymmetry coefficient, a statistic used in the analysis of wealth or income inequality
 lac operon, a DNA operon relating to the metabolism of lactose found in some bacteria

Sports 
 London Aquatics Centre
 Los Angeles Chargers, a National Football League team based in Carson, California
 Los Angeles Clippers, a National Basketball Association team based in Los Angeles

Transport
 LAC, the ICAO operator designator for Lockheed Corporation (Lockheed Aircraft Corporation), United States
 Lignes Aériennes Congolaises (defunct airline of the Democratic Republic of the Congo)
 Linea Aerea Cuencana, a regional airline operating out of Cuenca, Ecuador
 Líneas Aéreas Canarias
 Lockheed Aircraft Company, American aerospace company
 Granada LAC, a BRT system in the city of Granada, Spain
 Lancing railway station, station code

See also

 Lanthanum carbide (LaC2)
 
 
 Lac (disambiguation)
 Lac
 LACS (disambiguation)
 LACC (disambiguation)